The Spenserian stanza is a fixed verse form invented by Edmund Spenser for his epic poem The Faerie Queene (1590–96). Each stanza contains nine lines in total: eight lines in iambic pentameter followed by a single 'alexandrine' line in iambic hexameter. The rhyme scheme of these lines is ABABBCBCC.

Example stanza
This example is the first stanza from Spenser's Faerie Queene.  The formatting, wherein all lines but the first and last are indented, is the same as in contemporary printed editions.
Lo I the man, whose Muse whilome did maske,
  As time her taught, in lowly Shepheards weeds,
  Am now enforst a far unfitter taske,
  For trumpets sterne to chaunge mine Oaten reeds,
  And sing of Knights and Ladies gentle deeds;
  Whose prayses having slept in silence long,
  Me, all too meane, the sacred Muse areeds
  To blazon broad emongst her learned throng:
Fierce warres and faithfull loues shall moralize my song.

Possible influences
Spenser's invention may have been influenced by the Italian form ottava rima, which consists of eight lines of iambic pentameter with the rhyme scheme ABABABCC. This form was used by Spenser's Italian role models Ludovico Ariosto and Torquato Tasso.

Another possible influence is rhyme royal, a traditional medieval form used by Geoffrey Chaucer and others, which has seven lines of iambic pentameter that rhyme ABABBCC. More likely, however, is the eight-line ballad stanza with the rhyme scheme ABABBCBC, which Chaucer used in his Monk's Tale.  Spenser would have been familiar with this rhyme scheme and simply added a line to the stanza, forming ABABBCBCC.

Use by others

Spenser's verse form fell into disuse in the period immediately following his death.  However, it was revived in the nineteenth century by several notable poets, including:
 Mary Tighe in Psyche or the Legend of Love
 Gerard Manley Hopkins in The Escorial (1860)
 Robert Southey in A Tale of Paraguay
 Lord Byron in Childe Harold's Pilgrimage
 James Hogg in Mador of the Moor
 John Keats in The Eve of St. Agnes
 Percy Bysshe Shelley in The Revolt of Islam and Adonaïs
 Sir Walter Scott in The Vision of Don Roderick.
 Robert Burns in "The Cotter's Saturday Night", which shows his ability to use English forms while praising Scotland.
 William Wordsworth in "The Female Vagrant", included in Wordsworth and Coleridge's Lyrical Ballads
 Alfred, Lord Tennyson in The Lotos-Eaters, in the first part of the poem.
 John Clare in The Harvest Morning and November
 George Washington Moon in Elijah the Prophet
 John Frederick Rowbotham in The Epic of London
 John Neihardt in The Divine Enchantment
 William Cullen Bryant in The Ages
 Sibella Elizabeth Miles in The Wanderer of Scandinavia; or, Sweden Delivered

In Eastern Europe, English stanzaic forms were not very popular, these countries being too far from England's literary influence. Neither rhyme royal nor the Spenserian stanza occurred frequently. English rhyme schemes remained unknown until the early 19th century, when Lord Byron's poems gained enormous popularity. In Poland the Spenserian stanza was used by Juliusz Słowacki and Jan Kasprowicz. In Czech literature Jaroslav Vrchlický wrote some poems in the Spenserian stanza, among others Stvoření světa (The Creation of the World):

Similar forms
In the long poem The Forest Sanctuary, Felicia Hemans employs a similar nine-line stanza, rhyming ABABCCBDD, with the first eight lines in iambic pentameter and the ninth an alexandrine.

References

Bibliography
 Morton, Edward Payson. "The Spenserian Stanza before 1700". Modern Philology, Volume 4, No. 4, April 1907. pp. 639–654

Stanzaic form
Epic poetry
Edmund Spenser